John Mackenzie School is a historic private school situated in Francistown, Botswana.

It caters for the education of boys and girls from Transition (Standard 0) to A-Levels in a multi-cultural, interdenominational environment. The school is Francistown's first English-medium education institution for primary and secondary education. A Cambridge International Examinations (CIE) accredited institution, it is highly regarded as the school of choice in Northern Botswana and the country at large, and as a gateway to the best local and international institutions of higher education.

It is named in honour of Scottish missionary John Mackenzie (1835–99), who spent his working life among, and who argued for the rights of, the Tswana people.

See also

 Education in Botswana
 List of secondary schools in Botswana

References

External links 
 , the school's official website
 John Mackenzie School - Francistown, Botswana
 John Mackenzie Prom 2008 - Tati River Lodge
 Google Maps

1899 establishments in the British Empire
Educational institutions established in 1899
2nd-millennium establishments in Botswana
Cambridge schools in Botswana
Francistown
Private schools in Africa
Secondary schools in Botswana